Dead Body on Broadway is a 1969 German thriller film directed by Harald Reinl and starring George Nader, Heinz Weiss and Heidy Bohlen. It was part of the series of films portraying FBI agent Jerry Cotton.

The film's sets were designed by the art director Ernst H. Albrecht. It was shot at the Tempelhof Studios in Berlin.

Plot
Cotton is called in to investigate a crime on Broadway because an FBI agent has died while working undercover. Before he has expired he got rid of the booty from a recently committed huge robbery. Where he disposed of it is unknown. All of the culprits are arrested by the FBI but the main villain Costello is soon broken free by a hitherto rivaling gang. His new accomplices presume he knew the location of the booty and he tries to live up to their expectations. The demised agent's girl-friend Cindy cannot help but notice she needs protection. Jerry Cotton hears her calling and stops at nothing to catch Costello.

Cast

Bibliography

References

External links

1969 films
West German films
1960s crime thriller films
German crime thriller films
German sequel films
1960s German-language films
Films directed by Harald Reinl
Films set in the United States
Films based on crime novels
Films based on German novels
Constantin Film films
Films shot at Tempelhof Studios
1960s German films